"And death shall have no dominion" is a poem written by Welsh poet Dylan Thomas (1914–1953). The title comes from St. Paul's epistle to the Romans (6:9).

Publication history
In early 1933 Thomas befriended Bert Trick, a grocer who worked in the Uplands area of Swansea. Trick was an amateur poet who had several poems published in local papers. In spring 1933 Trick suggested the two men both write a poem on the subject of 'immortality'. Trick's poem, which was published in a newspaper the following year, contained the refrain "For death is not the end." In 1933, in a notebook marked 'April', Thomas wrote the poem "And death shall have no dominion". Trick persuaded him to seek a publisher and in May of that year it was printed in New English Weekly.

On 10 September 1936, two years after the release of his first volume of poetry (18 Poems), Twenty-five Poems was published. It revealed Thomas's personal beliefs pertaining to religion and the forces of nature, and included "And death shall have no dominion".

In popular culture
 The Year One Space: 1999 episode "Death's Other Dominion" is titled after the poem.
 The poem is featured significantly in the television series Beauty and the Beast.
 It was used at the start and ending of the movie Omega Doom.
 The titles of the novels They Shall Have Stars by James Blish and No Dominion by Charlie Huston are taken from the poem.
 In Brave Saint Saturn's album Anti-Meridian the final five lines of the first verse open the CD, accompanied by music.
 In the film Truly, Madly, Deeply the title is quoted in a conversation about death.
 In the film The Weight of Water from the book of the same title written by Anita Shreve, Sean Penn in the role of melancholy poet Thomas Janes recites the last four lines of the first stanza. At the end of the film after Janes drowns, the film reprises his recitation of the second and third lines of this section, but this time the film leaves the last line poignantly unspoken.
 In the second and final part of the 2011 BBC TV miniseries The Field of Blood the poem's second through ninth lines are recited from memory by character Dr. Pete, played by Peter Capaldi, in a pub as he drunkenly faces his imminent death of cancer, seated alone.
 George Clooney recites part of the poem in the 2002 movie Solaris.
 In the Season 6 soundtrack of Lost the piece which shares its name with the poem is played while detailing Richard Alpert's life.
 Paul Kelly performs the poem as a song on his 2018 album Nature.
 In the German film Rosenstrasse, 2004, directed by Margaretha von Trotta, a Jewish woman about to be deported to Auschwitz recites part of the poem to another woman who is also about to be deported, "Though lovers be lost, love shall not, and death shall have no dominion."
 Dr. Niki Alexander, forensic pathologist, played by Emilia Fox, reads the whole poem at her father's memorial service in the 2012 episode of Silent Witness (TV Series): "Death Has No Dominion, Pt. 1" and the episode title is based on the poem.
Mithu Sanyal's German novel Identitti (2020) features the poem as part of a ritual carried out by the goddess Kali, a character in the novel.

Notes

Bibliography

External links

Anglo-Welsh literature
Poetry by Dylan Thomas
Poems about death
Modernist poems